The 2017 Sibiu Cycling Tour was a cycling stage race that took place between 5 and 9 July 2017 in and around Sibiu, Romania.

The race was won by Colombian climber Egan Bernal, riding for the  squad. Bernal took the race lead after winning the second stage of the race, the queen stage, to the summit finish at Bâlea Lake; he then further extended his lead by winning the following day to Păltiniș. Bernal ultimately won the race by 1 minute, 40 seconds ahead of  rider Colin Stüssi, with the podium being completed by another  rider, Valentin Baillifard, a further 35 seconds behind.

Bernal's performances were enough for him to win two other jerseys, winning the points and young rider classifications.

Teams
Initially, 21 teams were invited to the race. The peloton featured three Professional Continental Teams, 17 Continental Teams and a Romanian national team, including for the first time, teams from North America.

However,  and  did not compete, which left the starting peloton at 19 teams.

Route
The race route was announced in December 2016.

Stages

Prologue
5 July 2017 — Sibiu to Sibiu, individual time trial (ITT)

Stage 1
6 July 2017 — Sibiu to Sibiu, 

The first stage covered  of rolling terrain including 7 categorised climbs. After  of the stage, two riders – Edwin Ávila and Moritz Fußnegger – broke away from the peloton building up at one stage a 6 minute advantage.

Stage 2
7 July 2017 — Sibiu to Bâlea Lake, 

Soon afterwards, overall leader Edwin Ávila was dropped by the small leading group and with  remaining a pair of riders – Daniel Jaramillo and Gabriel Reguero – attacked. A counter-attack from Egan Bernal saw him catch and then pass the two escapees, and he continued to build a lead over the chasing group. The other contenders were unable to respond and Bernal won the stage by over a minute.

Stage 3
8 July 2017 — Sibiu to Păltiniș, 

An early breakaway of five riders, including the leader of the mountains classification, Moritz Fußnegger built up a lead of around 7 minutes. By the penultimate climb at Jina, the remainder of the breakaway had a 1' 30" advantage over the chasing peloton, before being caught and passed by two attackers – Simon Pellaud and Andrea Borso. This pair in turn were caught by a small group of riders with  remaining and from that group it was once more Egan Bernal who attacked in the closing stages, and with the rest of the riders unable to respond, claimed his second successive stage victory, further extending his overall lead.

Stage 4
9 July 2017 — Sibiu to Sibiu,

Classification leadership table
In the 2017 Sibiu Cycling Tour, six different jerseys were awarded. The most important was the general classification, which was calculated by adding each cyclist's finishing times on each stage. Time bonuses were awarded to the first three finishers on all stages with the exception of the time trial: the stage winner won a ten-second bonus, with six and four seconds for the second and third riders respectively. Bonus seconds were also awarded to the first three riders at intermediate sprints; three seconds for the winner of the sprint, two seconds for the rider in second and one second for the rider in third. The rider with the least accumulated time is the race leader, identified by a yellow jersey. This classification was considered the most important of the 2017 Sibiu Cycling Tour, and the winner of the classification was considered the winner of the race.

There was also a mountains classification, the leadership of which was marked by a green jersey. In the mountains classification, points towards the classification were won by reaching the top of a climb before other cyclists. Each climb was categorised as either category SA, A, B or C, with more points available for the higher-categorised climbs. The third jersey represented the young rider classification, marked by a white jersey. This was decided the same way as the general classification, but only riders born on or after 1 January 1994 were eligible to be ranked in the classification.

Additionally, there was a points classification, which awarded a white jersey. In the points classification, cyclists received points for finishing in the top 15 in a stage, and unlike in the points classification in the Tour de France, the winners of all stages (with the exception of the prologue) were awarded the same number of points. For winning a stage, a rider earned 25 points, with 20 for second, 16 for third, 14 for fourth, 12 for fifth, 10 for sixth with a point fewer per place down to a single point for 15th place. The fifth classification was the sprints classification, the leader of which was awarded a blue jersey. In the sprints classification, riders received points for finishing in the top three at intermediate sprint points during each stage – awarded on a 3–2–1 scale – and these intermediate sprints also offered bonus seconds towards the general classification as noted above.

The sixth and final jersey represented the classification for Romanian riders, marked by a red jersey. This was decided the same way as the general classification, but only riders born in Romania were eligible to be ranked in the classification. There was also a team classification, in which the times of the best three cyclists per team on each stage were added together; the leading team at the end of the race was the team with the lowest total time.

Notes

References

External links 

 

Sibiu Cycling Tour
2017 in Romanian sport
UCI Europe Tour races
Cycle races in Romania